Merle Haggard's Greatest Hits is a compilation album by the American country music artist of the same name. It was released in 1982 via MCA Records.

Track listing

Chart performance

References

1982 compilation albums
Merle Haggard albums
Albums produced by Jimmy Bowen
Albums produced by Ken Nelson (United States record producer)
MCA Records compilation albums